George Tomlinson McLean (born 26 May 1943) is a Scottish former  footballer who played at both professional and international levels as a centre forward.

Career
Born in Paisley, McLean played club football for Drumchapel Amateur, St Mirren, Rangers, Dundee, Dunfermline Athletic, Ayr United, Vancouver Whitecaps and Hamilton Academical.

He earned one international cap for Scotland, in a goalless draw with the Netherlands on 30 May 1968.

References

1943 births
Living people
Scottish footballers
Scottish expatriate footballers
Scotland international footballers
Scottish Football League players
North American Soccer League (1968–1984) players
St Mirren F.C. players
Rangers F.C. players
Dundee F.C. players
Dunfermline Athletic F.C. players
Ayr United F.C. players
Hamilton Academical F.C. players
Vancouver Whitecaps (1974–1984) players
Association football forwards
Drumchapel Amateur F.C. players
Scotland under-23 international footballers
Expatriate soccer players in Canada
Scottish expatriate sportspeople in Canada
Footballers from Paisley, Renfrewshire